The women's 200 metre individual medley event at the 2004 Olympic Games was contested at the Olympic Aquatic Centre of the Athens Olympic Sports Complex in Athens, Greece on August 16 and 17.

Ukraine's Yana Klochkova became the first woman to claim two consecutive Olympic titles in the individual medley, finishing the final race with a time of 2:11.14. American swimmer and three-time Olympian Amanda Beard took home the silver, in an American record time of 2:11.70, while Zimbabwe's Kirsty Coventry, on the other hand, broke an African record of 2:12.72 to earn the bronze medal.

Records
Prior to this competition, the existing world and Olympic records were as follows.

Results

Heats

Semifinals

Semifinal 1

Semifinal 2

Final

References

External links
Official Olympic Report

W
2004 in women's swimming
Women's events at the 2004 Summer Olympics